El Hassan Houbeib (born 31 October 1993) is a Mauritanian footballer who plays as a defender for Iraqi Premier League side Al-Zawraa and the Mauritania national football team.

International career
Houbeib made his first senior appearance for Mauritania on 27 July 2019, in the African Nations Cup Qualifiers 2020 match against Cape Verde.

Honours
Al-Zawraa
Iraqi Super Cup: 2021

References

External links
 
 Hassan Houbeib at playmakerstats.com (English version of zerozero.pt and ogol.com.br)

1993 births
Living people
Mauritanian footballers
Mauritania international footballers
Association football defenders
Mauritanian expatriate footballers
Mauritanian expatriate sportspeople in Iraq
Expatriate footballers in Iraq
AS Garde Nationale players
Al-Zawraa SC players
2021 Africa Cup of Nations players
Mauritania A' international footballers
2018 African Nations Championship players